Northop Hall is a large village and community near Mold, in Flintshire, Wales. Located to the east of Northop, near the A55 North Wales Expressway, the village is largely residential in character. At the 2001 Census, the village of Northop Hall had a population of 1,665, falling to 1,530 at the 2011 census.

The village has one pub, The Top Monkey (formerly known as The Boar's Head); until recently there was a second, the Black Lion, and they were universally known locally as the 'Top Monkey' and 'Bottom Monkey'. There are active cricket and hockey clubs.

The hall that gives the village its name is a 13th-century manor house which is located in close proximity to Smithy Lane and the Mold to Connah's Quay road. It was the most important house in Northop parish. It was occupied by local aristocracy including the Evans family, ancestors of author George Eliot. The original Northop Hall is now a private house and not to be confused with Northop Hall Country House Hotel which is Victorian and located elsewhere in the village.

Landmarks
St Marys Church, Northop Hall
Northop Hall Country House Hotel
Northop Hall Girls F.C.
Northop Hall Cricket Club Ground

References

External links 
Profile of village prepared by Flintshire County Council (PDF format)
Photos of Northop Hall and surrounding area on geograph.org.uk
Northop Hall Community Council

Villages in Flintshire
Communities in Flintshire